The 2020 KPMG Women's PGA Championship was the 66th Women's PGA Championship. It was originally scheduled to be played June 25–28 at Aronimink Golf Club in Newtown Square, Pennsylvania. It was rescheduled to October 8–11 as a result of the COVID-19 pandemic. Known as the LPGA Championship through 2014, it was the third of four major championships on the LPGA Tour during the 2020 season.

Kim Sei-young won with a record low aggregate of 266, 14 under par, after a final round 63. She finished five strokes ahead of Inbee Park, who had a last round of 65.

Field
The field included 132 players who met one or more of the selection criteria and commit to participate by a designated deadline. With the exception of one place reserved for the winner of the ShopRite LPGA Classic, the final field was set on September 22.

Leading contenders were expected to include world number two Nelly Korda, 2017 winner and world number three Danielle Kang, world number four and 2020 ANA Inspiration runner-up Brooke Henderson, and 2018 winner and world number six Park Sung-hyun. Several top-ranked South Koreans did not play, including world number one Ko Jin-young, Ryu So-yeon, Kim Hyo-joo and Lee Jeong-eun. Also in the field were six club professionals. Sandra Gal and Julia Engström were the recipients of the two sponsors invites.

Qualification criteria
 Active LPGA Hall of Fame members
 Past winners of the Women's PGA Championship
 Professionals who have won an LPGA major championship since the start of 2015
 Professionals who have won an official LPGA tournament since the start of 2018
 Winner of the Dow Great Lakes Bay Invitational in 2019
 Professionals who finished in the top-10 and ties at the previous year's Women's PGA Championship
 Professionals ranked No. 1-40 on the Women's World Golf Rankings as of March 16, 2020
 Professionals ranked No. 1-40 on the Women's World Golf Rankings as of September 15, 2020
 The top-8 finishers at the 2019 LPGA T&CP National Championship
 The top finisher (not otherwise qualified via the 2019 LPGA T&CP National Championship) at the 2020 PGA Women's Stroke Play Championship
 Members of the European and United States Solheim Cup teams in 2019
 Maximum of two sponsor invites
 Any player who did not compete in the 2019 KPMG Women's PGA Championship due to maternity, provided she was otherwise qualified to compete.
 LPGA members ranked in the order of their position on the 2020 official money list as of the commitment deadline
 The remainder of the field will be filled by members who have committed to the event, ranked in the order of their position on the 2020 LPGA Priority List as of the commitment deadline

Past champions in the field

Made the cut

Round summaries

First round
Thursday, October 8, 2020

Second round
Friday, October 9, 2020

Third round
Saturday, October 10, 2020

Final round
Sunday, October 11, 2020

References

External links

Coverage on the LPGA Tour official site

Women's PGA Championship
Golf in Pennsylvania
PGA Championship
Women's PGA Championship
Women's PGA Championship
Women's PGA Championship
Women's PGA Championship